Rebuilding Paradise is a 2020 American documentary film directed and produced by Ron Howard. The film follows the rebuild of Paradise, California, following the 2018 California wildfires, specifically the Camp Fire, known as the deadliest and most destructive wildfire in California's history, and the most expensive natural disaster in the world in 2018 in terms of insured losses. The film was first announced in January 2019. Lincoln Else cinematographed the film, while Lorne Balfe and Hans Zimmer composed the score.

Acquired by National Geographic Films, Rebuilding Paradise had its world premiere at the Sundance Film Festival on January 24, 2020, subsequently followed by theatrical and television release several months later. The former faced challenges due to the COVID-19 pandemic. It later also saw digital and home media releases. The film received universal critical acclaim for its powerful portrayal of the residents of Paradise as well as the cinematography and score, though some critics found its narrative confusing.

Summary
Rebuilding Paradise begins by chronicling the 2018 Camp Fire, part of the 2018 California wildfires, which occurred in Paradise on November 8, 2018, through videos recorded by locals and a policeman. Prior, warnings of a potential fire exacerbated by strong winds had been declared. As predicted, the fire spread rapidly, destroying objects in a short period of time. Mandatory evacuation was soon declared. Residents are warned to evacuate on foot, though most violated and continued driving; many made their way out, while others died of suffocation.

The residents of Paradise then described close connection to it. Former mayor Woody Culleton recalls being an alcoholic living in the caravan of a backyard in 1981; he sobered up three years later, became an official in 2004, and subsequently became mayor. Meanwhile, many survivors were assisted by disaster recovery centers, though certain residents doubts Paradise will be rebuilt. A memorial was later held honoring the dead.

A month after the fire, the process of rebuilding was announced by the head of the Paradise Police. People later began living in the territory in trailers, they also reunite at a small party held by Paradise police officer Matt Gates. Three months later, however, the Federal Emergency Management Agency (FEMA) states that, due to the discovery of various lethal chemicals like benzene, debris must be removed before any property can be placed; this is met with reluctance-filled resident-government clashes. This slowly found a solution, and Culleton becomes the first person permitted to rebuild his house. While more houses were starting to be built, FEMA also made temporary houses. The Paradise High School also reopens by celebrating delayed graduates. On June 11, 2019, community leader Philip Allan John died from cardiac arrest; his wife, Michelle John, says that this and the Camp Fire stresses the need to prioritize health first. A resident says that the younger generations may not see a better future retaining in Paradise, as it was before the fire. However the film later shines more hope on a better future of the community, through the perseverance of its residents.

Meanwhile, the film reflects: while strong winds and history of logging factored the fire, the Pacific Gas and Electric Company (PG&E) is the main one. After the fire prediction, the company cut power to prevent the fire, but it did not, as one of its aged transmission lines sparked. This revelation saw outcry among residents calling them ignorant; Culleton sent a letter featuring photos of the aftermath. Paradise attorney Joe Early and environmental activist Erin Brockovich filed a lawsuit; the former said the company never cared about the environment during his experience working with them, and the latter said the company is responsible for much more incidents. The California Department of Forestry and Fire Protection (Cal Fire) deemed PG&E responsible. 9 months after the fire, prescribed burning was done towards the young trees in order to prevent future similar fires.

Production 

In January 2019, it was announced Ron Howard would direct the film and serve as a producer under his Imagine Entertainment banner, with National Geographic Documentary Films distributing.

Release
Rebuilding Paradise had its world premiere on January 24, 2020, at the Sundance Film Festival. A April 15 screening was also expected at the Tribeca Film Festival, but restrictions due to the COVID-19 pandemic cancelled the festival. It was also an official selection at the 2020 AFI Docs. At its July screening at the Edinburgh International Film Festival, every US$1 from the tickets sold goes to charities supporting Paradise. Meanwhile, on June 27, National Geographic released a 2-minute trailer to YouTube.

The film later premiered theatrically in the United States on July 31, 2020. Due to COVID-19 restrictions closing various theaters, Howard allows any medium of distribution possible, and eventually, over 70 virtual cinemas, "carefully selected" traditional theaters, and drive-in theaters which played it. National Geographic and Imagine Entertainment then took to distributor Abramorama, who distributed Howard's previous work, The Beatles: Eight Days A Week (2016). Rebuilding Paradise later saw a virtual cinema premiere on July 12, which amassed over 6,000 audiences, including first responders; the film's team said they were heartened by the news.

Critical reception
The consensus reads, "From the horror of natural disaster to the spirit summoned behind the titular effort, Rebuilding Paradise stirringly depicts one community's perseverance."

References

External links
 
 
 

2020 films
American documentary films
Imagine Entertainment films
National Geographic Society films
Films produced by Ron Howard
Films produced by Brian Grazer
Films directed by Ron Howard
Films scored by Hans Zimmer
Films scored by Lorne Balfe
2020s English-language films
2020s American films